Grace-St. Luke's Episcopal School is a coed, independent school for students age 2 through 8th grade.

History
Located in the historic Central Gardens neighborhood in Midtown Memphis, Grace-St. Luke's (or GSL) was founded in 1947, though the school's early origins date back to 1919, when Bartow B. Ramage, rector of St. Luke's Church began a parochial school for the neighborhood. His daughter Ethel Ramage would join as a teacher in 1923 after graduating from Columbia University, but closed the school in 1924 upon his retirement. It remained closed until 1947, when Mrs. S. Griffin Walker, who had taught kindergarten at St. Mary's School, asked Grace-St. Luke's rector Rev. Charles Stuart Hale, for space to open a kindergarten. He agreed, and thus began a kindergarten in the basement of the parish house. Grace-St. Luke's Episcopal Day School began in earnest in 1959 when a charter was issued and the first capital fund drive was begun. It had by this point become a Kindergarten through 6th grade school, and school leaders broke ground for a new day school building on Nov. 30, 1959.

That original Day School Building was dedicated in May 1960 by Tennessee's Episcopal Bishop Theodore Barth, and Grace-St. Luke's Episcopal School continued to grow. Improvements were made and new buildings eventually added, including Morton Hall Activities Building (and gymnasium) in 1970, Bratton Hall in 1974, making the addition of 10th, 11th, and 12th grades a reality. But due to continuing spatial and program needs that were virtually impossible to meet given the physical location of the school, the high school grades were discontinued by 1978/79 to better focus on educational and leadership opportunities for Lower and Middle School students. GSL went on to acquire additional properties (Snowden Athletic Field in 1984 and Miss Lee's Preschool in 1986). In the early 1990s, Grace-St. Luke's opened the Evans Building that links the church and school administrative offices to the Middle School and gymnasium.

In 2010, the school completed its first major new construction in 20 years. After that, opening the Anchor Center, a multipurpose building designed to ensure the school's sustainability and allow capacity for future growth. It houses a gymnasium, cafeteria, library, light-filled arts and music rooms, after school care space, and Middle School science labs.

Today, Grace-St. Luke's School serves nearly 500 students from age 2 through eighth grade. It is accredited by the Southern Association of Independent Schools and a number of other regional and national educational organizations. The school celebrates its 75th anniversary in 2022.

References

Schools in Memphis, Tennessee
Educational institutions established in 1947
Episcopal Church in Tennessee
Episcopal schools in the United States
Private elementary schools in Tennessee
Private middle schools in Tennessee
Private K–8 schools in the United States
1947 establishments in Tennessee